Harshvardhan Kadam, also known as Inkbrushme, is an artist from Pune, India, best known for illustrating children's books and painting religious murals on walls.

Biography
Harshvardhan Kadam studied applied art and visual communication at the IDC School of Design, Mumbai. He began his career in 2007 as an artist for comic books. After setting up Inkbrushnme he completed his postgraduate studies at IDC.

His works include the Clock Tower at Har Ki Pauri, Haridwar, and the mural at Yerawada Central Jail; a 300m-long painting titled 'Songs of the City', which depicts the story of the city Pune. A wall of the Planet Godrej displays his work. According to him "On the walls where I painted mythological characters, I figured that people stopped spitting or taking a leak there".

Selected publications

References

21st-century artists
Date of birth unknown
Living people
Indian illustrators
21st-century Indian painters
Year of birth missing (living people)